Hysenaj is a surname of Albanian origin. Notable people with the surname include:

Emir Hysenaj, Albanian-born bank employee, best known as the inside man in the 2006 Securitas depot robbery
Florian Hysenaj (born 2001), Kosovar footballer
Senad Hysenaj (born 1999), Albanian footballer

Surnames of Albanian origin